The 175th New York Infantry Regiment was an infantry regiment in the Union Army during the American Civil War.

Service
The 175th New York Infantry was recruited at large in New York beginning August 23, 1862 and mustered in for three-years service under the command of Colonel Michael K. Bryan.

The regiment was attached to Division at Suffolk, Virginia, VII Corps, Department of Virginia, to December 1862. 1st Brigade, Augur's Division, Department of the Gulf, to March 1863. 3rd Brigade, 3rd Division, XIX Corps, Department of the Gulf, to May 1863. 3rd Brigade, 2nd Division, XIX Corps, to August 1863. 2nd Brigade, 1st Division, XIX Corps, to February 1864. 3rd Brigade, 2nd Division, XIX Corps, Department of the Gulf, to July 1864, and Army of the Shenandoah, Middle Military Division, to January 1865. 3rd Brigade, Grover's Division, District of Savannah, Georgia, Department of the South, to March 1865. 3rd Brigade, 1st Division, X Corps, Army of the Ohio, Department of North Carolina, to May 1865. District of Savannah, Georgia, Department of the South, to July 1865. Department of Georgia to November 1865.

The 175th New York Infantry mustered out of service July 19, 1865, at Raleigh, North Carolina.

Detailed service
Left New York for Suffolk, Va., November 21, 1862. Duty at Suffolk, Va., until December 1862. Moved to New Orleans, La., and duty at Carrollton until March 6, 1863. Moved to Baton Rouge March 6. Operations against Port Hudson March 7–27. Moved to Algiers April 1, then to Berwick April 9. Operations in western Louisiana April 9-May 14. Bayou Teche Campaign April 11–20. Fort Bisland, near Centreville, April 12–13. Vermillion Bayou April 17. Expedition from Opelousas to Alexandria and Simsport May 5–18. Expedition from Berne's Landing to Berwick May 21–26. Franklin May 25. Moved to Port Hudson May 26–30. Siege of Port Hudson May 30-July 9. Assault on Port Hudson June 14. Surrender of Port Hudson July 9. Moved to Baton Rouge July 22, and duty there until March 1864. Operations about St. Martinsville November 12, 1863. Red River Campaign March 23-May 22. At Alexandria March 25-April 12. Cane River April 23–24. At Alexandria April 26-May 13. Retreat to Morganza May 13–20. Mansura May 16. At Morganza until July. Expedition from Morganza to the Atchafalaya May 30-June 5. Atchafalaya River June 1. Moved to Fort Monroe, Va., then to Washington, D.C., July 5–29. Sheridan's Shenandoah Valley Campaign August 7-November 28. Third Battle of Winchester September 19. Fisher's Hill September 22. Battle of Cedar Creek October 19. Duty at Kernstown and Winchester until January 1865. Moved to Savannah, Ga., January 5–22, and duty there until March. Moved to Wilmington, N.C., March 5, then to Morehead City March 10, and duty there until April 8. Moved to Goldsboro April 8, then to Savannah, Ga., May 2. Duty at Savannah and at other points in the Department of Georgia until November 1865.

Casualties
The regiment lost a total of 134 men during service; 2 officers and 12 enlisted men killed or mortally wounded, 3 officers and 117 enlisted men died of disease.

Commanders
 Colonel Michael K. Bryan - killed in action during the assault on Port Hudson, June 14, 1863
 Colonel John A. Foster

See also

 List of New York Civil War regiments
 New York in the Civil War

References
 Dyer, Frederick H. A Compendium of the War of the Rebellion (Des Moines, IA:  Dyer Pub. Co.), 1908.
Attribution

External links
 Guidons of the 175th New York Veteran Volunteer Infantry

Military units and formations established in 1862
Military units and formations disestablished in 1865
Infantry 175
1862 establishments in New York (state)
1865 disestablishments in New York (state)